Events from the year 1570 in art.

Events
Ustad ‘Osman becomes head of the painters at the Seraglio workshop of Sultan Murad III.

Works

 Federico Barocci - Rest on the Flight into Egypt (Vatican Museums)
Joachim Beuckelaer - The Four Elements (series completed)
Bernaert de Rijckere - The Festival of the Gods
El Greco - The Entombment of Christ (approximate completion date)
Paolo Veronese - The Allegory of Love (ceiling paintings for Prague Castle; now in National Gallery, London)

Births
November 15 - Francesco Curradi, Italian painter of the style described as Counter-Maniera or Counter-Mannerism (died 1631)
date unknown
Giuseppe Agellio, Italian painter (died after 1620)
Giulio Cesare Angeli, Italian painter (died 1630)
Cornelis Jacobsz Delff, Dutch painter (died 1643)
Tommaso Dolabella, Baroque painter from Venice (died 1650)
Renold Elstracke, one of the earliest native engravers in England (died 1625)
Epiphanius Evesham, British sculptor (died 1634)
Aegidius Sadeler II, Flemish engraver of the Sadeler family (died 1629)
Gillis van Valckenborch, Flemish painter (died 1622)
Francesco Zucco, Italian painter (died 1627)
probable
Abel Grimmer, Flemish painter (died c.1620)
Hans Krumpper, sculptor and plasterer (died 1634)
Pasquale Ottini, Italian painter active mainly in Verona (died 1630)
Isabella Parasole, Italian engraver on wood (date of death unknown)
Leonardo Parasole, Italian engraver on wood (date of death unknown)
Aegidius Sadeler, Flemish painter and engraver (died 1629)
Denis van Alsloot, Flemish painter (died 1626)
1570-1575:Simon Frisius, Dutch engraver (died 1628/29)

Deaths
January 19 - Paris Bordone, Venetian painter (born 1495)
October 1 – Frans Floris, Flemish painter (born 1519)
October 3 - Hieronymus Cock, Flemish Northern Renaissance painter, etcher and publisher of prints (born 1510)
November 27 - Jacopo Sansovino, Italian sculptor and architect, especially around the Piazza San Marco in Venice (born 1486)
date unknown
Gaspar Becerra, Spanish painter and sculptor (born 1520)
Francesco Imparato, Italian painter active mainly in his natal city of Naples (born 1520)
Ferdinando Manlio, Italian sculptor (date of birth unknown)
Francesco Melzi, Italian painter, beloved and favourite pupil of Leonardo da Vinci (born 1491)
Francesco Primaticcio, Italian painter, architect, and sculptor (born 1504)
Martin Van Cleve, Flemish painter (born 1520)
probable - Domenico del Barbieri, Florentine artist of the Renaissance period (born 1506)

References

 
Years of the 16th century in art